In statistics the Cramér–von Mises criterion is a criterion used for judging the goodness of fit of a cumulative distribution function  compared to a given empirical distribution function , or for comparing two empirical distributions.  It is also used as a part of other algorithms, such as minimum distance estimation.  It is defined as

Alternatively the two distributions can both be empirically estimated ones; this is called the two-sample case.

The criterion is named after Harald Cramér and Richard Edler von Mises who first proposed it in 1928–1930. The generalization to two samples is due to Anderson.

The Cramér–von Mises test is an alternative to the Kolmogorov–Smirnov test (1933).

Cramér–von Mises test (one sample)

Let  be the observed values, in increasing order.  Then the statistic is

If this value is larger than the tabulated value, then the hypothesis that the data came from the distribution  can be rejected.

Watson test

A modified version of the Cramér–von Mises test is the Watson test which uses the statistic U2, where

where

Cramér–von Mises test (two samples)

Let  and  be the observed values in the first and second sample respectively, in increasing order.  Let  be the ranks of the x's in the combined sample, and let  be the ranks of the y's in the combined sample. Anderson shows that

where U is defined as

If the value of T is larger than the tabulated values, the hypothesis that the two samples come from the same distribution can be rejected.  (Some books give critical values for U, which is more convenient, as it avoids the need to compute T via the expression above.  The conclusion will be the same).

References

Further reading

 

Statistical tests
Statistical distance
Nonparametric statistics
Normality tests